Necydalis diversicollis is a species of long-horned beetle in the family Cerambycidae. It is found in North America.

Subspecies
These two subspecies belong to the species Necydalis diversicollis:
 Necydalis diversicollis californica Linsley, 1940
 Necydalis diversicollis diversicollis Schaeffer, 1932

References

Further reading

External links

 

Necydalinae
Articles created by Qbugbot
Beetles described in 1932